Hilaire Pader (1607-1677) was a French painter, poet and translator. He translated a book of art history by Italian critic Gian Paolo Lomazzo in 1649. He authored La Peinture parlante in 1653 and Le Songe énigmatique de la peinture universelle in 1658. He was a personal friend of sculptor Pierre Affre.

References

1607 births
1677 deaths
Artists from Toulouse
French painters
French poets
Italian–French translators
17th-century French translators
Writers from Toulouse